Simon Barere (– 2 April 1951) was a Russian pianist. His surname Барер is transliterated Barer, but as an adult he adopted the spelling Barere in order to reduce the frequency of mispronunciation.

Biography
Barere was born in Odessa (then Russian Empire, now part of Ukraine) as the eleventh of thirteen children in a Jewish family. He studied at the St. Petersburg Conservatory under Anna Yesipova and then Felix Blumenfeld. Pianist Vladimir Horowitz was also a pupil of Felix Blumenfeld, although Barere was Blumenfeld's preferred student. After graduation, he played concerts throughout the region and taught at the Kiev Conservatory. He emigrated to Berlin, then to Sweden, and finally to the United States. During the autumn of 1935, he toured the UK under the management of Harold Holt, making a number of appearances as supporting artist to Richard Tauber. In 1985, his complete HMV recordings, made at Abbey Road Studios between 1934 and 1936, were remastered by Bryan Crimp and issued by APR.

Additional recordings have been issued on CD. There is also an astonishing home recording of Barere playing excerpts from his repertoire, in 1949.

Barere was especially known for his speed and finger dexterity; his rendition of Balakirev's Islamey and many other recordings were acclaimed. According to music critic Harold C. Schonberg, Barere produced a colourful piano tone and could also be highly musical.

Barere gave annual recitals at Carnegie Hall which were often recorded by his son, Boris. Among the performances recorded live in 1947 at Carnegie Hall was Liszt's Sonata in B minor, which was released on Remington Records in the 1950s. Other Barere performances include Liszt's Spanish Rhapsody, Reminiscences de Don Juan and Hungarian Rhapsody No. 12, Blumenfeld's Étude for the Left Hand Alone, and Rachmaninoff's Piano Concerto No. 2.

Recently, a 1948 broadcast of the Liszt Piano Concerto No. 1, from the Brooklyn Museum, has surfaced online.

Barere made a series of recordings for Remington in March 1951, showing the pianist in fine form before his sudden death next month.

On 2 April 1951, Barere suffered a cerebral hemorrhage during a performance of Grieg's Piano Concerto at Carnegie Hall, with Eugene Ormandy conducting the Philadelphia Orchestra. He collapsed and died backstage shortly thereafter.

References

External links
 Simon Barere's Liszt, Rachmaninoff, Balakirev, Chopin on Remington Records.
 Recordings by Simon Barere available through Amazon.

Russian classical pianists
Male classical pianists
1896 births
1951 deaths
Musicians who died on stage
Jewish classical pianists
Musicians from Odesa
Emigrants from the Russian Empire to the United States
Saint Petersburg Conservatory alumni
20th-century classical pianists
Emigrants from the Russian Empire to Germany
Emigrants from the Russian Empire to Sweden
Jewish Ukrainian musicians
Odesa Jews
20th-century Russian male musicians
Ukrainian classical pianists